The second season of Supermodel Me aired in 2011, with the shooting location in Singapore. The judging panel this season include Charmaine Harn, Geoff Ang, Olivier Henry, Elisabeth Gwee, Terence Lee and Lee Zhuan. Special appearances for the show included: Nadya Hutagalung, Antonia Chang, Paul Foster, Amber Chia, Deborah Henry, Rebecca Tan, Kim Robinson, Furqan Saini, Grego Oh, Gaile Lai. The premiere of thus season was held on March 17, 2011 in Marina Bay Sands - Singapore, the event was also attended by the previous winner Evelyn Alice Leckie.

This season also remarks Supermodel Me became the first television showout of Asia to ink a deal with popular location-based application Foursquare. The collaboration saw the integration of brands such as DKNY Jeans, with followers of the branded Supermodelme game rewarded with discounts for every virtual ‘Check-In’. In this season, Refinery Media entered into a partnership with Google - YouTube to distribute Supermodelme content on its site. Refinery Media also pioneered the use of “Hyperspot technology” with its integration into the show's website Supermodelme.tv, the use of “Hyperspot technology” on Supermodelme.tv allowed viewers to attain immediate information and access to whatever brands, products etc. they saw on screen while watching content on the website. This season also aired for the first time in HD quality on the MYX television channel.

This season will feature 12 contestants; four from Australia, two each from China, Singapore, Thailand, one from Indonesia, and Malaysia. The prizes for this cycle were a cash prize of 20,000S$ value FEVO Mastercard and many other prizes from the sponsors.

The winner was 16-year-old Avalon Hona Haloho Sinabutar from Australia.

Contestants
(Ages stated are at time of contest)

Results

 The contestant was eliminated
 The contestant quit the competition
 The contestant was originally eliminated but was saved
 The contestant won the competition

In episode 1, Melinda was safe due to Niki quitting.
In episode 9, there was no call-out and elimination
Episode 11 was the recap episode.

Photo shoot guide
Episode 1 photo shoot: Rugby player in group
Episode 2 photo shoot: Jurong Fishery Port catwalk
Episode 3 photo shoot: La Perla lingerie
Episode 4 photo shoot: Girl Fight
Episode 5 photo shoot: Balancing on Club21b outfit with balloon
Episode 6 photo shoot: Runaway debutanted
Episode 7 photo shoot: Close-up beauty shot
Episode 8 photo shoot: La Perla bikini in Bali
Episode 9 photo shoot: B&W body cover of clay properties at the beach
Episode 10 photo & commercial: DKNY jeans beside the pool
Episode 12 photo shoot: Greek goddesses

Average  call-out order
Final three is not included.

References

2011 television seasons